Richard Burridge (born 1951, in Rothbury, Northumberland) is a British film screenwriter and author. His credits include Absolute Beginners (1986). With his family he is an owner of several racehorses, including the late Desert Orchid.

External links 

Guardian article regarding death of Desert Orchid

1951 births
Living people
English writers
English screenwriters
English male screenwriters
British racehorse owners and breeders
People from Rothbury
Writers from Northumberland